Eureka is a small research base on Fosheim Peninsula, Ellesmere Island, Qikiqtaaluk Region, in the Canadian territory of Nunavut. It is located on the north side of Slidre Fiord, which enters Eureka Sound farther west. It is the third-northernmost permanent research community in the world.  The only two farther north are Alert, which is also on Ellesmere Island, and Nord, in Greenland.  Eureka has the lowest average annual temperature and the lowest amount of precipitation of any weather station in Canada.

Eureka's postal code is X0A 0G0 and the area code is 867.

Divisions
The base consists of three areas:

the Eureka Aerodrome which includes "Fort Eureka" (the quarters for military personnel maintaining the island's communications equipment)
the Environment and Climate Change Canada Weather Station
the Polar Environment Atmospheric Research Laboratory (PEARL), formerly the Arctic Stratospheric Ozone Observatory (AStrO)

PEARL is operated by a consortium of Canadian university researchers and government agencies known as the Canadian Network for Detection of Atmospheric Change. PEARL announced it would cease full-time year-round operation as of April 30, 2012, due to lack of funding, but this decision was reversed in May 2013 with the announcement of new funds.

History
Eureka was founded on April 7, 1947, as part of an initiative to set up a network of Arctic weather stations. On this date,  of supplies were airlifted to a promising spot on Ellesmere Island, and five prefabricated Jamesway huts were constructed. Regular weather observations began on January 1, 1948. The station has expanded over the years. At its peak, in the 1970s, at least fifteen staff were on site; in 2005, it reported a permanent population of zero with at least 8 staff on a continuous rotational basis.

Several generations of buildings have been developed. The latest operations centre, with work areas and staff quarters in one large structure, was completed in 2005.

Location and accessibility

The complex is powered by diesel generators. The station is supplied once every six weeks with fresh food and mail by air, and annually in the late summer, a supply ship from Montreal brings heavy supplies. On July 3, 2009, a Danish Challenger 604 MMA jet landed at Eureka's aerodrome.
The jet is a military observation aircraft based on the Challenger executive jet. This jet visited Eureka on a familiarization trip, in order to prepare for the possibility of Danish aircraft assisting in search and rescue missions over Canadian territory. The Canadian American Strategic Review noted critically that the first jet to fly a mission to Eureka was not Canadian.

At Eureka's latitude, a geosynchronous communications satellite, if due south, would require an antenna to be pointed nearly horizontally; satellites farther east or west along that orbit would be below the horizon. Telephone access and television broadcasts arrived in 1982 when Operation Hurricane resulted in the establishment of a satellite receiving station at nearby Skull Point, which has an open view to the south. The low-power Channel 9 TV transmitter at Skull Point was the world's most northern TV station at the time. In the 1980s, TV audio was often connected to the telephone to feed CBC-TV news to CHAR-FM in isolated CFS Alert. More recently, CANDAC has installed what is likely the world's most northerly geosynchronous satellite ground-station to provide Internet-based communications to PEARL.

Other inhabited places on Ellesmere Island include Alert and Grise Fiord.

Flora and fauna
Eureka has been described as "The Garden Spot of the Arctic" due to the flora and fauna abundant around the Eureka area, more so than anywhere else in the High Arctic. Fauna include muskox, Arctic wolves, Arctic foxes, Arctic hares, and lemmings. In addition, summer nesting geese, ducks, owls, loons, ravens, gulls and many other smaller birds nest, raise their young, and return south in August.

Climate
Eureka experiences a polar climate (ET). The settlement sees the midnight sun between April 10 and August 29, with no sunlight at all between mid-October and late February. Average winter temperatures are almost comparable to those found in northeastern Siberia. However, summers are slightly warmer than other places in the Canadian Arctic because Eureka is somewhat landlocked, being near the centre of Ellesmere Island. Even so, since record keeping began, the temperature has never exceeded , first reached on July 14, 2009. Although a polar desert, evaporation is also very low, which allows the limited moisture to be made available for plants and wildlife. Its frost-free  season averages 56 days, much longer than many other places nearby.

See also
List of research stations in the Arctic

References

Bibliography

 Couture, Nicole J. Sensitivity of Permafrost Terrain in a High Arctic Polar Desert An Evaluation of Response to Disturbance Near Eureka, Ellesmere Island, Nunavut. Ottawa: National Library of Canada = Bibliothèque nationale du Canada, 2003. 
 Whyte, L. G., B. Goalen, J. Hawari, D. Labbe, C. W. Greer, and M. Nahir. 2001. "Bioremediation Treatability Assessment of Hydrocarbon-Contaminated Soils from Eureka, Nunavut". Cold Regions Science and Technology. 32, no. 2-3: 121–132.
 Eureka at the Atlas of Canada

External links

Populated places established in 1947
Extreme points of Earth
Weather extremes of Earth
Ellesmere Island
Arctic research
Populated places in Arctic Canada
Populated places in the Qikiqtaaluk Region
1947 establishments in the Northwest Territories
Meteorological stations